Heart's Desire (Swedish: Av hjärtans lust) is a 1960 Swedish comedy film directed by Rolf Husberg and starring Jarl Kulle, Margita Ahlin and Edvin Adolphson. It was shot at the Sundbyberg Studios of Europa Film in Stockholm. The film's sets were designed by the art director Arne Åkermark.

Cast
 Jarl Kulle as 	Baron Patrik Sinclair
 Margita Ahlin as 	Harriet Humbert
 Edvin Adolphson as 	Anton Humbert
 Gösta Cederlund as Lindgren
 Hans Lindgren as	Stefan Forell
 Renée Björling as 	Aurore, Patrik's Mother
 Signe Enwall as 	Aunt Ulla
 Birgitta Valberg as Henriette Löwenflycht
 Ulla-Bella Fridh as 	Maja, maid
 Torsten Lilliecrona as 	Hans Mortimer
 Åke Fridell as Sjöberg
 Wiktor Andersson as Gardener
 Björn Bjelfvenstam as Forell's colleague
 Allan Edwall as 	Servant
 Arthur Fischer as 	Old farmar
 Åke Harnesk as 	Hen keeper
 Birger Lensander as 	Manager
 Curt Löwgren as 	Mechanic
 Maritta Marke as 	Tourist
 Marianne Nielsen as 	Tourist
 Bellan Roos as Cook
 Chris Wahlström as 	Peasant woman

References

Bibliography 
 Qvist, Per Olov & von Bagh, Peter. Guide to the Cinema of Sweden and Finland. Greenwood Publishing Group, 2000.

External links 
 

1960 films
Swedish comedy films
1960 comedy films
1960s Swedish-language films
Films directed by Rolf Husberg
Swedish films based on plays
1960s Swedish films